The 1999 Porsche Tennis Grand Prix was a women's tennis tournament played on indoor hard courts in Filderstadt, Germany. that was part of Tier II of the 1999 WTA Tour. It was the 22nd edition of the tournament and was held from 4 October until 10 October 1999. First-seeded Martina Hingis won the singles title, her third at the event after 1996 and 1997, and earned $80,000 first prize money.

Entrants

Seeds

Other entrants
The following players received wildcards into the singles main draw:
  Mary Joe Fernández
  Jennifer Capriati
  Anke Huber

The following players received wildcards into the doubles main draw:
  Mia Buric /  Anke Huber

The following players received entry from the singles qualifying draw:

  Sabine Appelmans
  Elena Dementieva
  Lisa Raymond
  Silvia Farina Elia

The following players received entry as lucky losers:
  Magüi Serna
  Anne-Gaëlle Sidot

The following players received entry from the doubles qualifying draw:
  Květa Hrdličková /  Barbara Rittner

Prize money

Finals

Singles

 Martina Hingis defeated  Mary Pierce, 6–4, 6–1
 This was Hingis' seventh title of the year.

Doubles

 Chanda Rubin /  Sandrine Testud defeated  Arantxa Sánchez Vicario /  Larisa Neiland, 6–3, 6–4

References

External links
 ITF tournament edition details
 Tournament draws

Porsche Tennis Grand Prix
Porsche Tennis Grand Prix
1999 in German tennis
1990s in Baden-Württemberg
Porsch